Cosmo the Merry Martian was a comic book published by Archie Comics in the late 1950s. The comic was created by Bob White as a way to provide a family-appropriate comic for children with an interest in the then-current space race. The title character was the first Martian to visit the Earth. The title only lasted for six issues. Every issue, including the last one, had a cliffhanger ending.

Besides the title character, other characters are Orbi (Cosmo's astronaut companion), Professor Thimk (the scientist who invented the Martian spaceship, but was not on it when it took off from Mars), and Astra (Cosmo's girlfriend). In the first issue, while they are traveling toward their intended destination of Earth, a meteor damages their spaceship, and they crash land on Earth's moon. The moon turns out to be inhabited by beings named Oogs, who live underground.

A reboot of the series, titled Cosmo the Mighty Martian, began publication in January 2018. The new series is written by Ian Flynn with art by Tracy Yardley and Matt Herms, all of whom previously collaborated on Archie's Sonic the Hedgehog comic series.

References

External links
 Schematic diagram of underground moon city
 Cover art for some issues

Archie Comics characters
Archie Comics titles
1958 comics debuts
Comics characters introduced in 1958
1959 comics endings
Fictional Martians
Humor comics
Science fiction comics